are a type of traditional Korean boot, which, along with , is a subdivision of Korean shoes. The  refers to all kind of shoes that do not go up to the ankle.  are usually made of leather, and artisans who make the shoes are called .  were originally worn by the Northern kingdoms of Korea. The horse-riding cultures of the North appear to have typically worn leather boots, while the farmers of the South wore shoes of leather or straw. Different types of boots were worn by military and civil officials.

See also

Cowboy boot

References

Korean footwear
Boots
Folk footwear
Korean words and phrases